Mağaraköy or Mağara is a village in the İdil District of the Şırnak Province in Turkey. The village is populated by Kurds of the Salihan tribe and had a population of 20 people in 2021.

Population 
Mağara was a large village at the start of the 1900s and was home to the Yazidi Çelkî tribe. When the Ottomans called upon them to join the army in 1910s, they rebuked. No school existed in the village.

In 2020, the village had a population of 20, increased from 6 in 2011 – all male. In the 1980s, the village was reported to be populated by the Hevirkan tribe, a tribe of Yazidi belief. In 2018, the village was reported to be populated by the Salihan tribe. The Salihan tribe has both Muslim and Yazidi members, but the ones in Mağara are Yazidi.

References 

Yazidi villages in Turkey
Kurdish settlements in Şırnak Province
Villages in İdil District